Vesneri is a village in Tartu Parish, Tartu County in Estonia.

Vesneri is home to Weisner Park and Alley (Vesner Park and Boulevard) which is a small wooded area containing houses and an unnamed road.

References

Villages in Tartu County